Abu Reza Muhammad Nezamuddin is a Bangladesh Awami League politician and the incumbent Member of Parliament from Chittagong-15.

Early life
Nezamuddin was born on 15 August 1968 in Chittagong District at Satkania Upazila under Madarsha Union. He has a M.A. and a PhD degree.

Career
Abu Reza Nadwi MP was elected to Parliament from Chittagong-15 as a candidate of Bangladesh Awami League. He is an associate professor in Da`wah & Islamic Studies Department, International Islamic University Chittagong since 14 August 2004. He is the chairman of a number of foundation including Allama Fazlullah Foundation, Darul Hikma Education Foundation, Chittagong International School (CIS), Arabian International Madrasah and Emirates Welfare & Educational Complex Trust.

Personal life
Nezamuddin is married to Rizia Reza Chowdhury. His wife is a member of the "Central Bangladesh Women League".

References

External links
 Abu Reza Nadwi MP

10th Jatiya Sangsad members
11th Jatiya Sangsad members
Awami League politicians
1968 births
Living people
People from Satkania Upazila